Eileen Chang  (；September 30, 1920 – September 8, 1995), also known as Chang Ai-ling or Zhang Ailing, or by her pen name Liang Jing (梁京), was a Chinese-born American essayist, novelist, and screenwriter. She was a well-known feminist woman writer of Chinese literature, known for portraying life in the 1940s Shanghai and Hong Kong.

Chang was born with an aristocratic lineage and educated bilingually in Shanghai. She gained literary prominence in Japanese-occupied Shanghai between 1943 and 1945. However, after the Communist takeover of China, she fled the country. In the late 1960s and early 1970s, she was rediscovered by scholars such as C. T. Hsia and Shui Jing. Together with the re-examination of literary histories in the post-Mao era during the late 1970s and early 1980s, she rose again to literary prominence in Taiwan, Hong Kong, Mainland China, and the Chinese diaspora communities. In the early 1990s, Chang became popular to the people in China again.

Chang was a realist and modernist writer. Her most important contribution was her construction of a unique wartime narrative, one that deviated from the grand accounts of national salvation and revolution. She sought to recount the seemingly irrelevant details and experiences of daily life of ordinary men and women in periods of social change and violence. Chang was also known for her view of modern history, displaying colours, lines, and moods in her writing and juxtaposition of historical reality with the domain of domesticity.

Life

Childhood and youth
Chang was born Zhang Ying in Shanghai, China on September 30, 1920. She was the first child of Zhang Zhiyi ( 1896–1953) and Huang Suqiong ( 1893–1957). Chang's maternal great-grandfather, Huang Yisheng ( 1818–1894), was a prominent naval commander. Chang's paternal grandfather, Zhang Peilun (1848–1903) married Li Ju'ou ( 1866–1916) and was son-in-law to Li Hongzhang, an influential Qing court official. She also spent her childhood with paternal aunt Zhang Maoyuan ( 1898–1991).

In 1922, when Chang was two years old, the family relocated to Tianjin. When she was three, her father introduced her to Tang poetry. Beginning in 1924, her father often brought back prostitutes or concubines and became heavily addicted to opium, which led to fights between her parents. During this time, Chang's mother decided to travel with her aunt to study in France. In 1927,  after Chang's father promised to end his drug usage and extramarital affairs, Chang and her mother came back and settled in Shanghai. However, Chang's parents eventually divorced in 1930. After that, Chang and her younger brother Zhang Zijing (1921–1997) were raised by their father.

At the age of 18, Chang contracted dysentery. Instead of seeking medical treatment, her father beat her and forced her to stay in her bedroom for six months. Chang eventually ran away to live with her mother and they stayed with her mother for nearly two years, until she went to university.

Education
 
Chang started school at age 4. Chang had obtained excellent English skills besides her native Chinese. In 1937, she graduated from an all-female Christian boarding high school, St. Mary's Hall, Shanghai, even though her family was not religious.

At an early age, under her mother's influence, Chang began painting, playing piano, and learning English.

In 1939, Chang was accepted to the University of London on a full scholarship, but was unable to attend due to World War II. Instead, she studied English Literature at the University of Hong Kong, where she met her lifelong friend, Fatima Mohideen ( died 1995). When Chang was one semester short of earning her degree in December 1941, Hong Kong fell to the Empire of Japan. Chang's famous works were completed during the Japanese occupation.

Marriages 
In 1943, Chang met her first husband Hu Lancheng when she was 23 and he was 37. They married the following year in a private ceremony. Fatima Mohideen was the sole attendee. In the few months that he courted Chang, Hu was still married to his third wife. Although Hu was labelled a traitor for collaborating with the Japanese during World War II, Chang continued to remain loyal to Hu. Shortly thereafter, Hu chose to move to Wuhan to work for a newspaper. While staying at a local hospital, he seduced a 17-year-old nurse, Zhou Xunde, who soon moved in with him. When Japan was defeated in 1945, Hu used another identity and hid in the nearby city of Wenzhou, where he married Fan Xiumei. Chang and Hu divorced in 1947.

While in MacDowell Colony, New Hampshire, Chang met and became involved with the American screenwriter Ferdinand Reyher, a Philadelphia native nearly 30 years her senior. During the time they were briefly apart in New York (Chang in New York City, Reyher in Saratoga), Chang wrote to Reyher that she was pregnant with his child. Reyher wrote back to propose. Although Chang did not receive the letter, she telephoned the following morning to inform Reyher she was arriving in Saratoga. Reyher had a chance to propose to her in person, but insisted that he did not want the child. Chang had an abortion shortly afterward. On August 14, 1956, the couple married in New York City. After the wedding, the couple moved back to New Hampshire. After suffering a series of strokes, Reyher eventually became paralyzed, before his death on October 8, 1967.

Death 
On September 8, 1995, Chang was found dead in her apartment on Rochester Avenue in Westwood, Los Angeles, by her landlord. According to her friends, Chang had died of natural causes several days before her building manager discovered her body, after becoming alarmed that she had not answered her telephone. Her death certificate states that she died from cardiovascular disease. According to Chang's will, she was cremated without any memorial service, and her ashes were scattered in the Pacific Ocean.

After Chang's death, Song Qi was responsible for her works.

Career

Shanghai
At the age of 10, Chang's mother renamed her as Aìlíng, a transliteration of Eileen, in preparation for her entrance into an English school. While in high school, Chang read Dream of the Red Chamber, one of the Four Great Classical Novels of Chinese literature, which influenced her work throughout her career. Chang displayed great literary talent and her writings were published in the school magazine. The following year, she wrote her debut short novel at the age of 12.

Chang's writing is heavily influenced by the environment in which she lives. Shanghai and Hong Kong in the 1940s were the background of many of her earlier novels. She was known for her “aesthetic ambivalence” where the narrative style and language were reminiscent of the traditional “linked-chapter” novel while the setting was more in line with modern urban melodramas. Chang also sought to probe and examine the psychology her characters.

In 1943, Chang was introduced to the prominent editor Zhou Shoujuan, and gave him a few pieces of her writing. With Zhou's support, Chang soon became the most popular new writer in Shanghai. Within the next two years, she wrote some of her most acclaimed works, including Love in a Fallen City (Qing Cheng Zhi Lian) and The Golden Cangue (1943). In her English translation of The Golden Cangue, Chang simplified English expressions and sentence structures to make it easier for readers to understand.

Several short stories and novellas were collected in Romances (Chuan Qi) (1944). It instantly became a bestseller in Shanghai, boosting Chang's reputation and fame among readers and also the Chinese literary circle.

A collection of her essays appeared as Written on Water (Líu Yán ) in 1945. Her literary maturity was said to be far beyond her age. As described by Nicole Huang in the introduction to Written on Water, "The essay form became a means for Eileen Chang constantly to redefine the boundaries between life and work, the domestic and the historic, and meticulously to weave a rich private life together with the concerns of a public intellectual." In 20th century China, Chang experimented with new literary language. In her essay entitled "writing of one's own," Chang retrospectively remarks on her use of a new fictional language in her novella Lianhuantao Chained Links. 

In the early years of her career, Chang was famously associated with this comment:

Hong Kong

In 1945, Chang's reputation waned due to postwar cultural and political turmoil. The situation worsened after the Communist 1949 victory in the Chinese civil war. Eventually, Chang left mainland China for Hong Kong in 1952, realizing her writing career in Shanghai was over. In Hong Kong, she worked for the United States Information Service (USIS), which promoted United States interests overseas. During this time, she wrote two anti-communist works,The Rice-Sprout Song (Yang Ge) and Naked Earth (Chidi zhi lian, 赤地之戀) (also sometimes rendered in English as Love in Redland), both of which she later translated into Chinese and published in Taiwan. The Rice-Sprout Song was Chang's first novel written entirely in English. 

Chang wrote Naked Earth at the direct request of the USIS. She used a plot outline supplied by USIS agents to write the book. According to academic Brian DeMare, the book is consequently by the anti-Communist paranoia of the United States Cold War mentality and lacks the poetry and nuance of Chang's other works.

She also translated a variety of English books into Chinese, most notably The Old Man and the Sea by Ernest Hemingway and The Legend of Sleepy Hollow by Washington Irving. Chang's translation of The Old Man and the Sea was seen as Cold War propaganda for the USIS and is argued to have directly influenced her writing and translating of The Rice-Sprout Song.

She then left for the United States in 1955, never to return to mainland China again.

Chang sought literary inspiration not only from Western European novels but also from local novels. She rejected the notion that there was a war or revolution in her works, and she did not acknowledge a connection to Tolstoy and his War and Peace.

United States
In 1955, Chang moved to America and sought a job as an English writer, but was unsuccessful. Her work was rejected by publishers many times. Chang's move from Hong Kong to the U.S. in the 1950s marked an important turning point in Chang's literary career as she had gone from being a famous author to an ordinary writer.

In 1960s, Chang was constantly searching for new job opportunities, particularly ones that involved translating and writing screenplays. Chang once tried to adapt a screenplay for Hollywood with Chinese elements, but was unsuccessful because the agent thought the role had too much content and psychological changes. Chang became a U.S. citizen in 1960 and headed to Taiwan for more opportunities, returning to the U.S. in 1962.

Betrayal is an overarching theme that permeates Chang's later works, notably her English essay "A Return to the Frontier" (1963) and one of her last novels Little Reunions (2009). Compared to her previous works, there are many more tragedies and betrayals in her writings later on in her life.

As soon as Chang arrived in America, she began to write three novels based on her life: The Fall of the Pagoda, The Book of Change, and Little Reunions. In 1963, Chang finished her English semi-biographical novels, The Fall of the Pagoda and The Book of Change. Both were believed to be her attempts to offer an alternative writing style to mainstream America; she did not succeed. The full-length novels were not published until 2010, 15 years after her death. These three novels revived Chang's fame and bought renewed attention on her works. In 1966, Chang had a writing residency at Miami University in Oxford. In 1967, Chang held a short-term job at Radcliffe College.

In 1969, upon the invitation of Shih-Hsiang Chen (陳世驤 Chén Shìxiāng), a professor of Oriental Languages at the University of California, Berkeley, Chang became a senior researcher at the Center for Chinese Studies of Berkeley. She researched the special terms used by the Chinese Communists as well as on Dream of the Red Chamber. In 1971, Professor Chen died, and Chang subsequently left her position at Berkeley. In 1972, Chang relocated to Los Angeles. In 1975, she completed the English translation of Shanghai Flowers, a celebrated Qing novel written in Wu Chinese by Han Bangqing. Among her papers retrieved from the University of Southern California, the manuscript for the translated English version was found after her death and published.

Chang's later writing style was heavily influenced by her tragic life experiences, notably her description of mutual betrayals between mother and daughter. When she adapted her memories into numerous autobiographies, her late writing style gradually matured. Chang was good at describing the details of the families in her novels, which allowed for her readers to understand the emotions of the characters and their situations.

In 1978, Crown Magazine published "Lust, Caution", “Xiang Jian Huan”(相見歡) and “Fu Hua Lang Rui”(浮花浪蕊), all written by Eileen Chang.

Eileen Chang has been listed as one of China's four women geniuses, together with Lü Bicheng, Xiao Hong and Shi Pingmei.

Influence
During the 1970s, Chang's legacy had such a significant impact on many creative writers in Taiwan that several generations of “Chang School writers” (張派作家) emerged. Notable Taiwanese authors include Chu T’ien-wen, Chu T’ien-hsin, Yuan Chiung-chiung.

With collective efforts to unearth the literary histories of the pre-revolutionary days in the post-Mao era, a renewed Eileen Chang “fever” swept through the streets of Mainland China. The name Eileen Chang became synonymous with the glories of a bygone era. As with Taiwan in the 1970s, a group of young women authors who were clearly inspired by Chang rose to prominence in the 1980s and 1990s. Other notable Mainland China authors influenced by Chang include Wang Anyi, Su Tong, and Ye Zhaoyan.

Dominic Cheung, a poet and professor of East Asian languages at the University of Southern California, said that had it not been for the Chinese civil war, Chang would have been a recipient of the Nobel Prize in Literature.

While the film based on Chang's novel Lust, Caution received mixed reviews in the US and the pan-Chinese territories of Taiwan, Hong Kong, and Mainland China, it nevertheless has become one of the most prominent and debated films in recent decades, winning both the Golden Lion award at the Venice Film Festival and Golden Horse Award for best film of the year in Taipei in 2007. The film was directed by critically acclaimed director Ang Lee and featured two of China's most well-known actors, Tony Leung Chiu-wai and Tang Wei.

One of Chang's most famous works, Love in a Fallen City, has been adapted into stage performances by the Hong Kong Repertory Theatre in 1987, 2002, and 2005. In 2006, the theatre even took the Cantonese performance to New York, Shanghai, and Toronto, thus bringing international attention to this story.

In 1997, some of Chang's manuscripts were donated to the East Asian Library at the University of Southern California (USC) after being exhibited at the university. Most of the content of the manuscripts were Chang's works created in America, including the translation of "The Sing-song Girls of Shanghai".

Works in English translation
 Half a Lifelong Romance (1948, English: 2016; trans. by Karen S. Kingsbury)
 Little Reunions (2018; trans. by Martin Merz and Jane Weizhen Pan).  
 Love in a Fallen City (1943, published in English in October 2006 by New York Review Books) Translated by Karen S. Kingsbury. 
The Golden Cangue, in Modern Chinese Stories and Novellas, 1919–1949 (ed. Joseph S M Lau et al.) HC  PB 
 Lust, Caution Translated by Julia Lovell. New York:  Anchor Books, 2007.  
Naked Earth (tr. of ) Hong Kong: Union Press, 1956.
The Rouge of the North (tr. of ) HC  PB 0520210875
Traces of Love and Other Stories PB 
The Sing-song Girls of Shanghai (Chang's tr. of Han Bangqing's novel) 
Sealed Off
Jasmine Tea

Films
The following scripts were penned by Chang:

 Bu Liao Qing (1947) (Unending Love, modified from novel , published as movie script)
 Tai Tai Wan Sui (1947) (Long Live the Missus!)
 Ai le zhongnian (1949) (The Sorrows and Joys of Middle Age)
 Jin Suo Ji (1950) (The Golden Cangue)
 Qing Chang Ru Zhan Chang (1957) (The Battle of Love, script written in 1956)
 Ren Cai Liang De (unknown) (script written in 1956)
 Tao hua yun (1959) (The Wayward Husband, script written in 1956)
 Liu yue xin niang (1960) (The June Bride)
 Wen rou xiang (1960)
 Nan bei yi jia qin (1962)
 Xiao er nu (1963) (Father Takes a Bride)
 Nan Bei Xi Xiang Feng (1964) (南北喜相逢)
 Yi qu nan wang (1964) (a.k.a. )

The following are films adapted from Eileen Chang's novels:
 Qing Cheng Zhi Lian (1984) (Love in a Fallen City)
 Yuan Nu (1988)
 Hong Meigui Yu Bai Meigui (1994) (The Red Rose and the White Rose)
 Ban Sheng Yuan (1997) (Eighteen Springs)
 Lust, Caution (2007)
 Love After Love (2020 film) (第一爐香)

In popular culture
A 20-episode TV series, The Legend of Eileen Chang, written by Wang Hui-ling and starring Rene Liu, was aired in Taiwan in 2004.

Malaysian singer Victor Wong wrote a song titled "Eileen Chang" ("Zhang Ailing") in 2005.

Taiwanese writer Luo Yijun ( 駱以軍 ) includes quotations and themes from Chang's writings and life in his novel Daughter.

In 2020 on the occasion of the centennial celebration of Chang's birth, an online exhibition Eileen Chang at the University of Hong Kong'' was presented on the website for the University Museum and Art Gallery, Hong Kong. The exhibition pieced together a narrative that highlights the early stages of Chang's literary career.

See also
Chinese literature
Women writers in Chinese literature
List of Chinese authors
List of graduates of University of Hong Kong
Su Qing – a Republican-era writer
Nellie Yu Roung Ling – first Chinese modern dancer, author and fashion designer

References

Portrait 
   Zhang Ailing. A Portrait by Kong Kai Ming at Portrait Gallery of Chinese Writers (Hong Kong Baptist University Library).

External links

 Collected drawings of Eileen Chang, Shanghai 1936–1946 in mini-tofu#7 
 Love Everlasting (Buliao qing) (Sang Hu, dir., 1947) with English subtitles - Film based on Eileen Chang's first screenplay
 Long Live the Missus! (Taitai wansui) (Sang Hu, dir., 1947) with English subtitles - Film based on Eileen Chang's second screenplay
 Full translation of Long Live the Missus! (1947) - MCLC Resource Center Publications
 Eileen Chang in Chinese Movie Database (Chinese)
 

1920 births
1995 deaths
20th-century American essayists
20th-century Chinese novelists
20th-century Chinese women writers
20th-century Chinese writers
Alumni of the University of Hong Kong
American dramatists and playwrights
American women essayists
American women screenwriters
American women short story writers
American writers of Chinese descent
Burials at sea
Chinese dramatists and playwrights
Chinese emigrants to the United States
Chinese women essayists
Chinese women novelists
Chinese novelists
Chinese women screenwriters
Chinese women short story writers
Chinese short story writers
Educators from Shanghai
MacDowell Colony fellows
People from Westwood, Los Angeles
Republic of China novelists
Republic of China short story writers
Screenwriters from Shanghai
Short story writers from Shanghai
University of California, Berkeley College of Letters and Science faculty
Writers from Los Angeles
20th-century American women writers
20th-century American screenwriters